Knaresborough was a parliamentary constituency which returned two Members of Parliament (MPs) to the House of Commons of the Parliament of the United Kingdom until 1868, and then one MP until its abolition in 1885.

History

Before the Great Reform Act
Knaresborough was a parliamentary borough, first enfranchised by Mary I in 1553. The borough consisted of part of the town of Knaresborough, a market town in the West Riding of Yorkshire. In 1831, the population of the borough was approximately 4,852, and contained 970 houses.

Knaresborough was a burgage borough, meaning that the right to vote was confined to the proprietors of certain specific properties (or "burgage tenements") in the borough; in Knaresborough there was no requirement for these proprietors to be resident, and normally the majority were not. This meant that the right to vote in Knaresborough could be legitimately bought and sold, and, for most of its history until the Great Reform Act of 1832 reformed the franchise, the majority of the burgages were concentrated in the hands of a single owner who could therefore nominate both MPs without opposition. Nevertheless, contested elections were possible, and in 1830, when there were theoretically about 90 qualified voters, 45 people actually voted. But the landowners had other resources beyond the votes they owned, as the bailiff of the lord of the manor was also the returning officer, and of the 45 who attempted to vote in 1830 the bailiff rejected the votes of 23.

In the 16th and 17th century, the main landowners in the area were the Slingsby family, who on occasion occupied both seats themselves, though usually they found it more advantageous to allow one of their fellow county magnates to have at least one of the seats. During the latter part of the Elizabethan period, the Duchy of Lancaster also seems to have been influential – the historian Sir John Neale considered that the Duchy probably nominated at least one of the two members in each Parliament from 1584 to 1597 – but the influence of the Slingsbys was consolidated later. By the mid-18th century, ownership had passed to the Dukes of Devonshire, who retained it until the Reform Act.

After the Great Reform Act
The Reform Act extended Knaresborough's boundaries, bringing in the remainder of the town and coinciding with the boundaries established during the previous decade for policing purposes. This increased the population by nearly a third, to 6,253. Nevertheless, Knaresborough was one of the smaller boroughs to retain both its seats, and the registered electorate for the first reformed election was only 278. In subsequent years this fell further, though by the 1860s it had recovered to reach around 270 once more, and inevitably Knaresborough's representation was reduced to one MP under the Representation of the People Act 1867. The extension of the franchise by the same Act trebled the electorate.

In 1880, after a disputed election with suspicion of corrupt practices, the result was declared void and the constituency's right to representation suspended while a Royal Commission investigated; however, unlike the investigations in some other constituencies at around the same period, nothing too damning was uncovered, and a by-election to fill the vacancies was held in 1881. It proved, nevertheless, to be Knaresborough's last Parliament, for its electorate was still too low and the borough was abolished by the Redistribution of Seats Act 1885. Its electors were transferred to the new Ripon division of the West Riding, a county constituency.

Members of Parliament

1553–1640

1640–1868

1868–1885

Election results

Elections in the 1830s
Tierney's death caused a by-election.

Mackintosh was appointed a commissioner of the India Board, requiring a by-election.

Brougham was called to the House of Lords' Lords Temporal, causing a by-election.

 The majority (23) of Entwisle's votes were challenged and the returning officer upheld the complaints. A similar challenge was laid against Cavendish, but parliament was dissolved the following day.

Mackintosh's death caused a by-election.

Elections in the 1840s

Elections in the 1850s

Lascelle's death caused a by-election.

 

 

 

 

As Woodd, Dent and Westhead received the same number of votes, they were all elected. However, in April 1853, after scrutiny, one vote was taken from Westhead and he was declared unduly elected.

Elections in the 1860s

 

 

Seat reduced to one member

Elections in the 1870s

Elections in the 1880s

The election was declared void on petition, causing a by-election.

Collins' death caused a by-election.

Notes

References

D Brunton & D H Pennington, Members of the Long Parliament (London: George Allen & Unwin, 1954)
 Cobbett's Parliamentary history of England, from the Norman Conquest in 1066 to the year 1803 (London: Thomas Hansard, 1808)
 J E Neale, The Elizabethan House of Commons (London: Jonathan Cape, 1949)
J Holladay Philbin, Parliamentary Representation 1832 – England and Wales (New Haven: Yale University Press, 1965)
Henry Stooks Smith, The Parliaments of England from 1715 to 1847 (2nd edition, edited by FWS Craig – Chichester: Parliamentary Reference Publications, 1973)

Parliamentary constituencies in Yorkshire and the Humber (historic)
Constituencies of the Parliament of the United Kingdom established in 1553
Constituencies of the Parliament of the United Kingdom disestablished in 1885
Knaresborough